Breislak is a lunar impact crater that lies within one crater diameter north-northwest of the crater Baco, in the southern part of the Moon. To the north-northwest is the crater Barocius, and to the west lies Clairaut. This crater was named in honor of geologist Scipione Breislak.

The rim of Breislak has been heavily worn by subsequent impacts, and several small craterlets lie along the outer wall. One of these craters has cut a notch in the southeast wall, and there are craterlets to the northeast and southwest of this break. A small crater lies on the inner face of the northern wall. The inner surface is roughly level, but pock-marked by several tiny craterlets.

Satellite craters
By convention these features are identified on lunar maps by placing the letter on the side of the crater midpoint that is closest to Breislak.

References

External links
 

Impact craters on the Moon